Ceyenne Doroshow (Park Slope, NY) is an author, activist, and the founder and executive director of G.L.I.T.S., an organization dedicated to creating sustainable housing and healthcare for Black transgender people. Doroshow was described in GQ as "A Godmother of the Black Trans Lives Matter Movement."

Career 
In June 2020, Doroshow co-organized the historic Liberation March, a Black Trans Lives Matter silent march in Brooklyn, NY, along with activist Raquel Willis, artist and activist West Dakota, the family of Iyanna Dior, and several black and transgender community organizations including the Marsha P. Johnson Institute, The Okra Project, and Black Trans Femmes in the Arts.

In 2021, Ceyenne was selected as a Grand Marshal for NYC Pride.

G.L.I.T.S. (Gays and Lesbians living in a Transgender Society) 
G.L.I.T.S. (Gays and Lesbians living in a Transgender Society), was founded in 2015 by Doroshow. G.L.I.T.S.'s mission is to provide long-term housing as healthcare for Black trans individuals in need . In an interview with activist Kimberly Drew via MoMA P.S. 1's Instagram page, Doroshow explained, "Creating housing is about saving people's lives. It's about getting them [Black transgender people] to the next step where they can be in their own kitchen ... and say, ‘I am home.'" According to their website, the foundation has facilitated services to educate mainstream healthcare and social service providers in both trans and sex worker rights as well as provide housing for post-incarcerated trans people and people who seek asylum for their sexuality or gender determination.

In 2020, Doroshow and her team at G.L.I.T.S. bailed LGBTQ inmates out of jails to housed them in safe Airbnb rentals during the COVID-19 pandemic. They also secured rent money and raised enough money to buy a $2 million 12-unit residential building that would be a free safe place for Black trans folks to live. The G.L.I.T.S. House in Queens, N.Y., opened in November.

References

American LGBT rights activists
American health activists
American housing activists
Transgender women
LGBT African Americans
African-American activists
Living people
Transgender rights activists
Year of birth missing (living people)